Alexandre Genest (born June 30, 1986) is a Canadian middle- and long-distance runner. He qualified for the 2012 London Olympics in the 3000 metre steeplechase with an A standard time and a first-place finish at the 2012 Canadian Olympics field & track trials in Calgary.

Personal life
Genest was born on June 30, 1986, in Shawinigan, Quebec.

Genest and partner Marie-Christine had a son on July 1, 2011, named Arno, just three weeks prior to Genest running a time that would qualify him for the 2011 World Championships in Athletics.

Career
Alex started to run in 1997, at the age of 12, for Paul Lejeune High School. Genest says he "climbed step by step from regional competitions to provincial competitions." His taste for challenge and overcoming led him to international competition in 2003 when he represented Canada at the World Youth Championships in Athletics, held in nearby Sherbrooke, Quebec. He finished 6th at the event while teammate Chris Winter captured bronze.

Genest studied kinesiology at the Université de Sherbrooke until transferring to University of Guelph in order to bring his running to the next level by training at Speed River Track Club, known to be the best distance training centre in the country.

Competition record

Career highlights
 1st, 2012 National Championships, Calgary, Alberta, Canada (Olympic "A" Standard).
 3rd, 2013 National Championships, Moncton, New Brunswick, Canada (IAAF World Championships "A" Standard).
 Personal Best: 3000 metres steeplechase:  8:19.33, Barcelona, 22/07/2011

References

External links
 
 
  (archive)
 
 
 

1986 births
Living people
Canadian male long-distance runners
Canadian male steeplechase runners
Olympic track and field athletes of Canada
Athletes (track and field) at the 2012 Summer Olympics
Sportspeople from Shawinigan
Athletes (track and field) at the 2015 Pan American Games
Pan American Games silver medalists for Canada
World Athletics Championships athletes for Canada
Pan American Games medalists in athletics (track and field)
Medalists at the 2015 Pan American Games
21st-century Canadian people